The 1965 SMU Mustangs football team represented Southern Methodist University (SMU) as a member of the Southwest Conference (SWC) during the 1965 NCAA University Division football season. Led by fourth-year head coach Hayden Fry, the Mustangs compiled an overall record of 4–5–1 with a conference mark of 3–4, tying for fourth place in the SWC.

Schedule

References

SMU
SMU Mustangs football seasons
SMU Mustangs football